The Roman Catholic Diocese of Bubanza is a diocese located in the city of Bubanza in the Ecclesiastical province of Bujumbura in Burundi.

History
 June 7, 1980: Established as the Roman Catholic Diocese of Bubanza from the then-Roman Catholic Diocese of Bujumbura

Special churches
The Cathedral is the Cathédrale Christ Roi (Cathedral of Christ the King) in Bubanza.

Bishops
 Bishops of Bubanza (Roman rite), in reverse chronological order
 Bishop Jean Ntagwarara (since October 24, 1997)
 Bishop Evariste Ngoyagoye (June 7, 1980  – April 21, 1997), appointed Bishop of Bujumbura

Coadjutor bishop
Georges Bizimana (2013-2019), did not succeed to see; appointed Bishop of Ngozi

See also
Roman Catholicism in Burundi

References

External links
 GCatholic.org
 Catholic Hierarchy 

Bubanza
Bubanza
Bubanza
Roman Catholic dioceses and prelatures established in the 20th century